In algebra, the theorem of transition is said to hold between commutative rings  if
  dominates ; i.e., for each proper ideal I of A,  is proper and for each maximal ideal  of B,  is maximal

References 

 

Theorems in ring theory